Mohawk Run is a  long 2nd order tributary to French Creek in Crawford County, Pennsylvania.

Course
Mohawk Run rises in a pond about 2 miles west-northwest of Jewel Corners, Pennsylvania, and then flows north, turns east, then turns north again to join French Creek about 0.25 miles northeast of Anderson Corners.

Watershed
Mohawk Run drains  of area, receives about 44.9 in/year of precipitation, has a wetness index of 459.85, and is about 60% forested.

See also
 List of rivers of Pennsylvania

References

Rivers of Pennsylvania
Rivers of Crawford County, Pennsylvania